Eugene Seale, Jr. (born June 3, 1964) is a former professional American football linebacker in the National Football League. He played six seasons for the Houston Oilers (1987–1992). 

In college, he played for Lamar University for the Lamar Cardinals, a team with a terrible win–loss record, even during his tenure, but not for lack of skill or effort on his part. He was the most decorated player in Lamar University history, and is widely considered the best linebacker the team ever had. He set the record for most tackles with 500 in three seasons. In 1983 alone, he had 180 tackles. Yet, he is probably best remembered for the first game he played, where he intercepted a pass and ran it back 52 yards for a touchdown. He was the Southland Conference’s Defensive Player of the Year in 1983, and received the League's player of the week award 5 times. He was inducted into the Hall of Honor in 1991, and was considered a Lamar Legend. He also excelled at both shot put and discus, leading the Cardinals to three successive SLC title wins.

At only 5'10", with 6' 2" being average height for NFL players, Seale had difficulty even being allowed into player tryouts for the Houston Oilers, the team closest to his home town. After turning down a free agent contract from Chicago, and being drafted by the New Jersey Generals of the USFL, just before the league folded, Seale joined the British Columbia Lions of the Canadian Football League briefly, then was cut. He gave up his dream and was working as a construction worker when everything changed. During the football strike of 1987, new players who had previously been cut, or not allowed to try out, got a chance to be pro football players, if only for a short time. Of those hastily hired replacements that played during the 1987 season, most were cut during training camp the next season, including Seale. But Coach Jerry Glanville, didn't want to lose him. He called him back after a few other players suffered injuries. Eugene Seale, on special teams and as a backup linebacker, had proven that his height didn't stop him from being an outstanding player. He went on to play five more seasons for the oilers until 1992.

In Seale's first NFL game for the Oilers, he intercepted a pass and ran it back 72 yards for a touchdown. This led to a 40-10 win over the Denver Broncos. Against Cincinnati, he intercepted a pass from Boomer Esiason intended for Tim McGee, and ran 45 yards before being tackled.

1964 births
Living people
People from Jasper, Texas
Players of American football from Texas
American football linebackers
Lamar Cardinals football players
Houston Oilers players
National Football League replacement players